U.S. Route 270 (US 270) is a spur of US 70. It travels through the states of Arkansas, Oklahoma, and Kansas. It travels through the cities of Oklahoma City, Oklahoma, Hot Springs, Arkansas, and McAlester, Oklahoma.

Route description

Kansas

US 270 begins in the southeast part of Liberal, Kansas, at an intersection with US 83 (running north–south through the intersection) and US 54. US 270 follows the south leg of this intersection, following US 83 south. US 270 only spends  in Kansas before crossing into Oklahoma. Seward County is the only Kansas county that US-270 serves.

Oklahoma

US 270 enters Oklahoma in Beaver County, the eastern third of the Oklahoma Panhandle. From here it continues east along US 64, then south towards Beaver, the county seat, along SH-23.  South of Beaver, the road joins with US 412 (OK) and SH-3, the latter of which US 270 will overlap with through most of northwest Oklahoma. After leaving the Panhandle and picking up US 183 near Fort Supply, the highways turn southwest towards Woodward. US 412 splits away in Woodward. US 270, concurrent with US 183 and SH-3, proceed southeast toward Seiling. West of Seiling, US 183 splits off to the south, but in Seiling, it is replaced by US 281.  The routes continue southwest to Watonga, where US 270/281 turn south along SH-8, while SH-3 continues due east to concur with SH-33. In Geary, US 270 splits off on an independent alignment, looping through Calumet before joining with Interstate 40.

US 270, attached to I-40, runs through the core of the Oklahoma City Metro area, passing through the western suburbs of El Reno and Yukon into Oklahoma City proper. The partnership runs just south of Downtown and the Bricktown entertainment district on the Crosstown Expressway. Major interchanges with I-44 and I-35 (the latter involving a concurrency with the interstate and its accompanying US Highway, US 62) are found in the city. I-40/US 270 also serve two eastern suburbs of Oklahoma City, Del City and Midwest City and form the northern boundary between Midwest City's civilian areas and Tinker Air Force Base. US-270 finally exits from I-40 on the west side of Shawnee.

US 270 serves most of the towns anchoring the area east of Oklahoma City, including Shawnee, Tecumseh, Seminole, Wewoka, and Holdenville. It continues southeast to the city of McAlester, a major southeastern Oklahoma city. It also serves many of the small towns east of McAlester, such as Krebs, Alderson, Bache, Haileyville, and Hartshorne.

After passing through Hartshorne, the roads curves to the northeast before turning onto a due east course taking it through Wilburton, Red Oak, and Wister. In Wister, it turns south, running across Wister Lake's dam, and proceeding southeast to Heavener. There, it meets US 59, which it will follow for the rest of its time in Oklahoma. The town highways head south from Heavener, passing through the Wister Wildlife Management Area before entering the Ouachita National Forest. The route serves as the northern terminus of US 259 near Page. The road then squeezes into a valley between Black Fork Mountain and Rich Mountain. In this valley, it crosses the state line into Arkansas.

Arkansas

US 270 enters Arkansas with US 59, and runs east to Acorn, where it meets US 71. The route then travels 15 miles north on US 71 to Y City where it splits off and continues east. The route then meets AR 88 in Pencil Bluff and AR 27 in Mt. Ida before heading to Hot Springs. Entering the city, US 270 meets US 70 southwest of town and runs concurrent with it around Hot Springs using the Dr. Martin Luther King Jr. Expressway before leaving the freeway and running along Malvern Avenue southeast of the city.  US 270 intersects with I-30 just outside Malvern, running a short distance northeast on the freeway before interchanging with the George Hopkins Loop bypass and running south around the city.  After meeting with US 67 east of town, the alignment then turns east-southeast meeting AR 229 in Poyen and AR 190/AR 291 in Prattsville before crossing paths with US 167 in Sheridan. The route trails east towards Pine Bluff terminating at and interchanging with I-530/US 65 in White Hall.

Directly east of this interchange, the highway used to continue along Sheridan Road before terminating at AR 365/Dollarway Road in northwest Pine Bluff.  This former section of the route is now signed AR 365 Spur.

History
The route was extended into Arkansas in 1931, supplanting State Road 8 from Oklahoma to Acorn and State Road  6 between Y City and Hot Springs. The roadway was mostly gravel or graded earth, with some segments in the Ouachita Mountains still under construction upon designation. In 1935, the US 270 designation supplanted the remainder of State Road 6 between Hot Springs and US 65 west of Pine Bluff. By this time, the entire route was gravel surfaced.

Between February 1937 and January 1938, US-270 was extended into Kansas, and overlapped K-27 from Johnson north to US-50 in Syracuse, where it terminated. KDOT requested that US-270 be extended north along K-27 to I-70 south of Goodland. This request was denied by the American Association of State Highway Officials in an October 14, 1967 meeting. In a November 14, 1980 resolution, the American Association of State Highway and Transportation Officials approved a request by KDOT to truncate US-270 to its current terminus in Liberal. Then in a May 18, 1981 resolution, US-270 was truncated to Liberal and the designation was removed from K-27.

Future
In Arkansas, it has been proposed that part of AR-51 will become part of US-270. On I-30's current concurrency with US-270, going east, drivers can take exit 99 and make a right on US-270 East. If drivers make a left when they take exit 99, they must make a left to get on I-30 West/US-270 West because there is currently no outlet past that. That road has been proposed to be extended to AR-51. This will form the future northern terminus of AR-51. This means that drivers can make a left to get on AR-51 South and will have to make a right to get on US-270 West. Then, US-270 will meet the current US-270. Drivers can make a left to get on the future US-270 Business East and must make a right to get on US-270 West, just like AR-51 did. From east to west, the future US-270 will go through the cities of Rockport, Butterfield, and Magnet Cove.

Major intersections

Special routes

Hot Springs business route

U.S. Highway 270B is a  business route in Garland County, Arkansas. It runs through downtown Hot Springs, Arkansas.

Major intersections

Malvern business route

U.S. Highway 270B is a business route of US 270 in Malvern, Arkansas, the small-town county seat of Hot Spring County. Created in 2006 from a former alignment of the parent route, US 270B passes through downtown Malvern, before forming an overlap with US 67.

Major intersections

Other loops and spurs

 Seminole, Oklahoma; Short highway connecting U.S. 270 to OK-9. This highway is disputed as a state or U.S. highway, as both signs are posted.
 Magnet Cove, Arkansas (decommissioned)

References

External links

 Endpoints of U.S. Highway 270

70-2
70-2
70-2
70-2
Transportation in Seward County, Kansas
Transportation in Beaver County, Oklahoma
Transportation in Harper County, Oklahoma
Transportation in Ellis County, Oklahoma
Transportation in Woodward County, Oklahoma
Transportation in Major County, Oklahoma
Transportation in Dewey County, Oklahoma
Transportation in Blaine County, Oklahoma
Transportation in Canadian County, Oklahoma
Transportation in Oklahoma County, Oklahoma
Transportation in Pottawatomie County, Oklahoma
Transportation in Seminole County, Oklahoma
Transportation in Hughes County, Oklahoma
Transportation in Pittsburg County, Oklahoma
Transportation in Latimer County, Oklahoma
Transportation in Le Flore County, Oklahoma
Transportation in Polk County, Arkansas
Transportation in Scott County, Arkansas
Transportation in Montgomery County, Arkansas
Transportation in Garland County, Arkansas
Transportation in Hot Spring County, Arkansas
Transportation in Grant County, Arkansas
Transportation in Jefferson County, Arkansas
2